The Mojo Gurus are an American rock band from St. Petersburg, Florida. The lineup consists of Kevin Steele (lead vocals, harmonica), Doc Lovett (guitar, vocals), Vinnie Granese (bass, vocals) and Sean Doyle (drums and vocals). It is a successor of glam band Roxx Gang in terms of lineup, but with a notable change of musical style.

They have performed throughout the United States as both headliner and as the supporting act for a diverse collection of bands, including David Allan Coe, Joe Perry and Johnny Winter. The band's first release was Hot Damn!. The band then worked with producer Jack Douglas (John Lennon, Aerosmith, the New York Dolls) and engineer Stephen Marsh (Jeff Beck, Muddy Waters) on the critically heralded Shakin' In The Barn, which was followed up by the grittier, more Southern-leaning Let’s Get Lit With... The Mojo Gurus. Their new album Who Asked Ya? features the track "Where You Hidin' Your Love", which was mixed by Tommy Henriksen (Lou Reed, Alice Cooper).

Discography

Studio albums
 Hot Damn! Release date: 2004 Label: Perris Records
 Shakin' In The Barn Release date: 2005 Label: Empire Musicwerks/Universal
 Let's Get Lit with...The Mojo Gurus Release date: 2009 Label: True North Records/E1
 Who Asked Ya? Release date September 16, 2014 Red River Entertainment/RED
 Gone Release date: 2017 Label: MRI Entertainment/Red

Music videos 
 Video: "I Can't Stand To Hear That Song Again"
 Director: Christian Moriarty
 Video: "Bandito"
 Director: Christian Moriarty

References

External links 
 Official Homepage
 Official Facebook Page
 Twitter Page

Rock music groups from Florida